Brendan O'Donoghue (born 15 December 1982 in Nenagh, Tipperary) is an Irish former professional snooker player.

Career 
O'Donoghue became the Irish nominee for 2009–10 season after he topped the Irish national standings by defeating John Torpey in the quarter-finals of the Irish Amateur Championship. Going into the competition Mario Fernandez was the only player who could take his tour spot away, but he lost to TJ Dowling in the quarters, which gave O'Donoghue's lead unassailable, despite Martin McCrudden winning the tournament. However O'Donoghue joined the main tour at a time when there was only six rankings events during the season and failed to make an impact on the main tour due to his full-time job, which restricted his practice to just two hours-a-night.

Performance and rankings timeline

Career finals

Team finals: 4 (1 title)

Pro-am finals: 2 (1 title)

Amateur finals: 9 (5 titles)

References

External links 
 Player profile on World Snooker
 Player profile on Global Snooker
 Player profile on Pro Snooker Blog

1982 births
Living people
Irish snooker players
People from Nenagh
Competitors at the 2013 World Games